Eco-friendly dentistry (also called environmentally friendly dentistry, green dentistry or sustainable dentistry) aims at reducing the detrimental impact of dental services on the environment while still being able to adhere to the regulations and standards of the dental industries in their respective countries.
 
There are no official governing agencies that certify an office as meeting eco-friendly standards. Dental offices in the United States of America can be recognised as eco-friendly offices by becoming members of the Eco Dentistry Association. Within England there are audit programmes available from the National Union of Students such as the Green Impact tool. People who want to be involved and discuss sustainable dentistry in a free and open forum are invited to be members at the Centre for Sustainable Healthcare.

History 

The term eco-friendly dentistry has roots originating from the environmental movement and environmentalism, which, in the Western world, is often perceived as having begun in the 1960s and 1970s. The rise of this movement is often credited to Rachel Carson, conservationist and author of the book Silent Spring. Subsequently, legislation in many countries throughout the world began gaining momentum in the 1970s and continues to the present day.

Eco-friendliness also has meaning in another context as a marketing term. It is used by companies to appeal to consumers of goods and services as having a low impact on the environment. Market research has found that an increasing number of consumers purchase goods and services that appeal to the values of environmental philosophy. The dental industry has adopted the concept of eco-friendliness both in a well-meaning, philosophical context and as a marketing term so that patients who subscribe to principles of sustainability can choose to visit these offices. 

The term has been criticised as being used for "greenwashing", which is the practice of deceptively promoting a product or service as environmentally friendly. Legislation in countries around the world have Trade Commissions and such to stop companies profiting with baseless claims on their goods and services. Individuals and bodies that work in the dental industry have also subsequently adopted the principles of sustainability and environmentalism and also as an advertisement to patients, clients and consumers. The Eco Dentistry Association is an accreditation organisation in the United States which has proposed outcomes towards becoming more sustainable.

In 2008, the Eco Dentistry Association (EDA) was co-founded by Dr. Fred Pockrass and his wife, Ina Pockrass. The EDA provides "education, standards and connection" to patients and dentists who practice green dentistry. The EDA aims to help dentists "come up with safe and reusable alternatives that lower a dentists' operating cost by replacing paper with digital media whenever possible." As of February 2011, the EDA has approximately 600 members. After the inception of the EDA, the dental industry in America saw more dentists and oral surgeons choosing to make their offices environmentally friendly.

In 2011, The Australian Dental Association implemented a policy of sustainability to provide guidelines to assist in the environmental sustainability of dental offices in Australia. In August 2017 the FDA adopted a sustainability in dentistry policy.

Elements of eco-friendly dentistry 

There is a growing amount of scientific information regarding the carbon footprint of the dental industry. These include papers by Duane relating to work carried out in Scotland and more recently England.

Recently, Public Health England published a report on the carbon footprint of NHS England dentistry. The report based on 2014 data provides a number of recommendations for the dental team in England to consider. The report demonstrated the considerable contribution of staff and patient travel to the overall carbon footprint.

To be environmentally responsible, offices can incorporate the four R's of environmental responsibility. The four R's are: reduce, reuse, recycle and rethink.

Reduce 

Having a paperless dental office reduces or eliminates the use of paper by going digital. This involves converting patient files, medical histories and other documentation to an electronic system. Going paperless not only makes information sharing easier and accessible but is a great way of keeping personal information secure. This saves money, boosts productivity and saves space as there is no need for any filing cabinets and is a great way of ensuring clinical records are more accurate.
Using digital radiography allows to keep all the patients' records in one spot, reduces the amount of radiation exposure and images and clinical photographs can be shared without losing the quality of the image.

Reuse

Clean Water

In many countries around the world there are strict mandatory limits on the use of mercury and the levels found in wastewater.  Mercury is traditionally used in dental restorations known as amalgam. In October 2013, Australia's Department of the Environment and Energy signed The Minamata Convention in a call for the reduction of amalgam usage by means of nine measures aiming to eventually phase out the use of amalgam. Mercury can be released into the environment when amalgam is placed, finished and polished or removed from a patient mouth and can be either rinsed into sewage systems or disposed of in landfill. By complying with the Australian Dental Association (ADA) Policy 6.11 and the current edition of the International Organization for Standardization ISO11143 Dentistry – Amalgam Separators, reducing the amount of mercury entering the environment by means of installing amalgam separators and traps to collect and separate amalgam waste before it enters the sewage system.  Amalgam that is collected from traps is then collected and recycled for reuse. 
With the phasing out of manual processing of radiographs and switching to digital radiography allows for offices not having to purchase developing liquids and these liquids are harmful to the environment and need to be collected to be disposed of correctly.

Water management
• Installing a water meter to monitor water usage.
• Handwashing sinks with motion-activated taps.
• Collect the water bills for the last year to benchmark a water usage audit. 
• Place interpretive signs about water conservation in staff rooms, toilets and surgeries. 
• Maintain and repair taps or fittings. 
• Use a non-water-based approach to cleaning where possible. 
• Retro flow controllers in key usage areas.
• Install 4-, 5- or 6-star water efficient appliances where appropriate.

Recycle 

Dental practices can recycle paper, cardboard, aluminum and plastics from plastic barriers and other water products contributing to sustainable environmentally friendly practices. Autoclave bags can be separated after opening and the paper and plastic recycled separately.

To become more eco-friendly or environmentally friendly dental practices can purchase biodegradable products therefore allowing more waste associated with the running of the practice to be recycled. Shredding of paper documents and recycling shredded paper will contribute to sustainable practices.

References

External links
Eco Dentistry Association

Dentistry
Sustainable building